Paskevich is a surname of the noble Russian  of Ukrainian Cossack origin. The transliteration from Ukrainian is Paskevych. Members of the family held the title of Knyaz and Count.

Notable members 
 Ivan Paskevich (1782–1856), field marshal in the Russian, Prussian, and Austrian armies
 Nicolay Paskevich (1907–2003), painter

References

Russian-language surnames
Surnames of Ukrainian origin

ru:Паскевич